Hope Papo is a South African politician from the African National Congress. He is a member of the National Assembly of South Africa.

References 

Living people
Members of the National Assembly of South Africa
African National Congress politicians
21st-century South African politicians
Place of birth missing (living people)
Year of birth missing (living people)